Tamki (also known as Temki) is an Afro-Asiatic language spoken in central Chad.

Notes

References
 Dakouli, Padeu, Antje Maass, and David Toomey. 1996. Rapid appraisal of the Saba language of the Guera, Chad. N’Djamena: Association SIL. Manuscript.

East Chadic languages
Languages of Chad